Augustus Frederick Goodridge (1839 – February 16, 1920) was a Newfoundland merchant and politician. He was premier of Newfoundland in 1894.

Early life
Goodridge was born in Devon, England. He arrived in Newfoundland when he was 13 and worked in his father's business.

Career
Goodridge became a fish merchant and ship owner in St. John's.  He joined the Conservative Party, and was first elected to the House of Assembly in 1880. He became leader of the Conservatives in 1884. From 1885 to 1889 he served in the conservative Protestant Reform Party government of Sir Robert Thorburn. The Reform Party collapsed and Thorburn went into opposition as leader of the new Tory Party.

Goodridge's Tories lost the 1893 election to the Liberals led by Sir William Whiteway. However, the Tories complained that Whiteway's Liberals had promised jobs to Newfoundlanders who voted for him and filed petitions in the Supreme Court under the Corrupt Practices Act against fifteen Liberal members of the House alleging bribery and corruption. The members were tried and found guilty and their seats were declared vacant.

In April 1894, in the midsts of the trials, Whiteway attempted to dissolve the House of Assembly and call new elections. Instead, Governor Sir Arthur Murray refused Whiteway's requested and instead appointed Goodridge  as the new Premier despite the fact that Goodridge's Tories were outnumbered by Liberals in the House of Assembly. In order to prevent the Tories from being defeated by a Motion of No Confidence, Murray repeatedly prorogued the House before a vote could be held. Regardless of this assistance by the governor, Goodridge's Tory Party government was short lived  due to a mounting political and economic crisis and resigned on December 12, 1894, after the collapse of two banks.

Goodridge lost his seat in the 1904 election. A few years later he  was appointed to the Legislative Council (Newfoundland's upper house) by Prime Minister Edward Patrick Morris.

References

External links 
 
 

1839 births
1920 deaths
Premiers of Newfoundland Colony
Members of the Legislative Council of Newfoundland
Dominion of Newfoundland politicians